Deng Acuoth (born 24 October 1996) is an Australian-South Sudanese professional basketball player for US Monastir of the Championnat National A and the BAL.

Professional career
Acuoth made his professional debut with the Sydney Kings of the National Basketball League (NBL) during the 2017–18 season. After a season in the SEABL with the Melbourne Tigers, he had another season with the Kings in 2018–19.

In 2019, Acuoth played for the Ballarat Miners in the NBL1 and won the Defensive Player of the Year Award. He then played for the South East Melbourne Phoenix during the 2019–20 NBL season.

Acuoth was set to play for the Ballarat Miners in 2020, before Covid saw the cancelled of the season. He returned to Ballarat in 2021.

For the 2021–22 season, Acuoth moved to Georgia to play for Mega Tbilisi of the Superliga. He later joined the Knox Raiders of the NBL1 South for the 2022 season.

On 10 August 2022, Acuoth signed with the Adelaide 36ers for the 2022–23 NBL season. He missed the season opener for betting activities that occurred during the off-season. He received a 10-match ban, with nine of the matches suspended subject to no additional breaches.

In January 2023, Acuoth joined the defending Basketball Africa League (BAL) champions US Monastir for the 2023 season.

National team career
Acuoth was on the South Sudan national basketball team for AfroBasket 2021. As the starting center of the team, he averaged 9.3 points and 9 rebounds per game.

References

External links
Deng Acuoth at RealGM

1996 births
Living people
Australian men's basketball players
Ballarat Miners players
Centers (basketball)
South Sudanese men's basketball players
Sydney Kings players
South East Melbourne Phoenix players
US Monastir basketball players
Adelaide 36ers players